David Wiemers (born April 18, 1968) is an American football coach. He is the offensive coordinator at Carthage Senior High School in Carthage, Missouri, a position he has held since 2021. Wiemers served as the head football coach at Emporia State University from 2001 to 2006, compiling a record of 35–32. He was the assistant head football coach and defensive coordinator at Pittsburg State University from 2011 to 2019.

Playing career
Wiemers played college football at Dodge City Community College and then at Washburn University in Topeka, Kansas.

Coaching career

Emporia State
Wiemers was the 21st head football coach for Emporia State University in Emporia, Kansas from 2001 until the end of the 2006 season. He led Emporia State to a record of 35 wins and 32 losses in six seasons as head coach after serving as an assistant for two years, becoming the fourth-most winning head coach in the history of the program.

Following a 5–6 record his first season, he led the Hornets to consecutive 9–3 years in 2002 and 2003. The two-year span included a victory in the 2002 Mineral Water Bowl and ESU’s first-ever appearance in the NCAA Playoffs in 2003, earning him the MIAA Coach of the Year after the 2003 season.

Tarleton State
Wiemers served as the offensive coordinator at Tarleton State University in Stephenville, Texas for the 2007 season.

Personal life
Dave's brother, Jon Wiemers, is the assistant head coach and offensive line coach for Southeast Missouri State University in Cape Girardeau, Missouri. His sister, Suzie Fritz, is the head volleyball coach at Kansas State University.

Head coaching record

References

External links
 Pittsburg State profile

1968 births
Living people
American football quarterbacks
Dodge City Conquistadors football players
Emporia State Hornets football coaches
Pittsburg State Gorillas football coaches
Saginaw Valley State Cardinals football coaches
Tarleton State Texans football coaches
Washburn Ichabods football players
High school football coaches in Missouri
People from Clay Center, Kansas